This is a complete list of songs by American country singer Carrie Underwood.

A

B

C

D

E

F

G

H

I

J

K

L

M

N

O

P

Q

R

S

T

U

W

Y

See also
 Carrie Underwood discography

Underwood, Carrie